Khurana is a village in the Sangrur district of Punjab, India. It's located, only seven kilometers east of Sangrur city, on the Sangrur-Patiala road in the Indian Punjab. Guru Hargobind, the sixth master of Sikhism, visited the village during his travels in 1616 CE coming from Akoī and stayed sometime close to the village pond, southeast of the village where a gurdwara Gurdwara Sahib Patshahi Chhevin now marks the site as a testimony to the visit.

References

Sangrur district
Villages in Sangrur district